Christoffer Norgren (born July 2, 1974) is a Swedish former professional ice hockey player who last played in the Örebro HK team in Swedish Hockey League.

External links 

 Norgren retires (Swedish)

References 

1974 births
Swedish ice hockey defencemen
Linköping HC players
Straubing Tigers players
Skellefteå AIK players
Örebro HK players
Swedish expatriate ice hockey players in Germany
Living people